Crenatosipho is a genus of sea snails, marine gastropod mollusks in the family Buccinidae.

Species
Species within the genus Crenatosipho include:
 Crenatosipho beaglensis Linse, 2002

References

External links

Buccinidae
Monotypic gastropod genera